Exile is the first studio album by the French symphonic black metal band Anorexia Nervosa. It was released in 1997, through Season of Mist. It is notable as the band's only industrial metal album, before they became a symphonic black metal band. It is also the only album to feature Marc Zabé as one of the guitarists and Stéphane Gerbaut on vocals, as he was later replaced by R.M.S. Hreidmarr when the band decided to abandon the industrial metal.

Track listing

Personnel
Anorexia Nervosa
 Pierre Couquet – bass guitar
 Nilcas Vant – drums
 Marc Zabé, Stéphane Bayle – guitars
 Stéphane Gerbaud – vocals

External links
 Exile at Encyclopaedia Metallum

Anorexia Nervosa (band) albums
1997 debut albums
Season of Mist albums